"Sounds Like Love" is a song written by Tommy Rocco and Charlie Black, and recorded by American country music artist Johnny Lee.  It was released in January 1983 as the second single and title track from the album Sounds Like Love.  The song reached number 6 on the Billboard Hot Country Singles & Tracks chart.

Chart performance

References

1983 singles
1982 songs
Johnny Lee (singer) songs
Song recordings produced by Jim Ed Norman
Asylum Records singles
Songs written by Charlie Black
Songs written by Tommy Rocco